Babes in Bagdad is a 1952 American comedy film directed by Edgar G. Ulmer and starring Paulette Goddard and Gypsy Rose Lee.

Plot
Arabian Nights princess Kyra goes on strike demanding equal rights for women, to the frustration of caliph Hassan. Supported by the caliph's godson, Ezar, Kyra enables the caliph to see the error of his polygamous ways, and he eventually settles down with his favourite wife, Zohara.

Cast
Paulette Goddard as Kyra
Gypsy Rose Lee as Zohara
Richard Ney as Ezar
John Boles as Hassan
Thomas Gallagher as Sharkhan
Sebastian Cabot as Sinbad
MacDonald Parke as Caliph
Christopher Lee as Slave dealer (Lee has no dialogue and is essentially an extra)

Critical reception
Allmovie wrote, "even the staunchest auteurist defenders of director Edgar G. Ulmer are hard-pressed to justify his participation in this relentlessly silly effort."

References

External links

1952 films
1952 comedy films
American comedy films
United Artists films
Films directed by Edgar G. Ulmer
1950s English-language films
1950s American films
English-language comedy films